Henry Clay McDowell (February 9, 1832 – November 18, 1899) was an American businessman and noted Standardbred horse breeder.

In 1857, he married Anne Smith Clay, daughter of Henry Clay Jr. with whom he had seven children. They made their home in Louisville, Kentucky until 1883 when they purchased Ashland Farm in Lexington, Kentucky that had belonged to Anne Clay McDowell's famous grandfather, Henry Clay.

During the American Civil War, Henry McDowell served with the Union Army. He rose to the rank of major as a member of the staff of General William Rosecrans. In business, McDowell was president of the Lexington and Eastern Railway.

In 1883, McDowell purchased Dictator, a top Standardbred sire who was one of the four influential sons of Hambletonian.

Henry Clay McDowell died at age sixty-seven in 1899.  In his obituary, the San Francisco Call newspaper wrote that he was "probably the best known citizen of Kentucky in private life."

Son Henry Jr. was a distinguished jurist and son Thomas was a successful horseman who won the 1902 Kentucky Derby. Daughter Madeline was a noted social reformer whose efforts were focused on child welfare, health issues, and women's rights.

References
 November, 1899 San Francisco Call obituary for Henry Clay McDowell
 Anne Smith Clay McDowell papers, 1851-1858, 1856-1858 at the University of Kentucky libraries

1832 births
1899 deaths
19th-century American railroad executives
American racehorse owners and breeders
Henry Clay family
Union Army officers
People of Kentucky in the American Civil War
Businesspeople from Lexington, Kentucky
Businesspeople from Louisville, Kentucky
Kentucky Republicans